The Old Campus District, University of South Carolina, is a  historic district centered on The Horseshoe on the main campus of the University of South Carolina in Columbia, South Carolina. On June 5, 1970, it was listed in the National Register of Historic Places.  On April 19, 1996 MTV Unplugged filmed Hootie & the Blowfish's concert on The Horseshoe before the release of their second album Fairweather Johnson.

National Registry listing
Old Campus District, University of South Carolina
 (added 1970 - District - #70000596)
 Bounded by Pendleton, Sumter, Pickens, and Green(e) Sts., Columbia
Historic Significance: 	Event, Architecture/Engineering
Architect, builder, or engineer: 	Mills, Robert, et al.
Architectural Style: 	Early Republic
Area of Significance: 	Architecture, Education
Period of Significance: 1800–1824, 1825–1849, 1850–1874
Owner: State (of South Carolina)
Historic Function: 	Education, Recreation And Culture
Historic Sub-function: College, Monument/Marker (Maxcy Monument)
Current Function: 	Education, Recreation And Culture
Current Sub-function: 	College, Monument/Marker (Maxcy Monument)

Historic pictorial map

Notable former residents
 James McBride Dabbs

See also
 List of Registered Historic Places in South Carolina

References

External links

Historical Photos of USC Buildings and Grounds at the University of South Carolina Library's Digital Collections Page]

Historic American Buildings Survey in South Carolina
University and college buildings on the National Register of Historic Places in South Carolina
University of South Carolina
Geography of Columbia, South Carolina
Historic districts on the National Register of Historic Places in South Carolina
Tourist attractions in Columbia, South Carolina
National Register of Historic Places in Columbia, South Carolina